Ludovic Proto (born 30 April 1965 in Pointe-a-Pitre, Guadeloupe) is a French former professional boxer who competed from 1989 to 1998. At welterweight, he held the European and French titles. He challenged for the European light middleweight title in 1994. As an amateur, he represented France at the 1988 Summer Olympics in the men's light welterweight division .

References

External links
 

Light-middleweight boxers
Welterweight boxers
Light-welterweight boxers
Olympic boxers of France
French people of Guadeloupean descent
European Boxing Union champions
Southpaw boxers
1965 births
Living people
People from Pointe-à-Pitre
Boxers at the 1988 Summer Olympics
Guadeloupean male boxers
French male boxers